Eastern Air Lines Flight 980 was a scheduled international flight from Asunción, Paraguay, to Miami, Florida, United States.

The wreckage was scattered over a large area of a glacier covered with snow. Over the decades, several search expeditions were only able to recover a small amount of debris, and searches for the flight recorders were unsuccessful. The accident remains the highest-altitude controlled flight into terrain in commercial aviation history.

Accident
Eastern Air Lines Flight 980 had departed President Stroessner International Airport in Asunción, Paraguay, at 17:57 on January 1, 1985, with a passenger contingent of nineteen and a crew of ten. The passengers were from Paraguay, South Korea and the United States. Among them was the wife of the then-U.S. Ambassador to Paraguay, Arthur H. Davis, and two Eastern pilots flying as passengers.

At 19:37 the pilot of Flight 980 told air traffic controllers at El Alto International Airport in La Paz, Bolivia, that he estimated landing at 19:47. The crew was cleared to descend from 25,000 feet to 18,000 feet. At some point after this exchange, the aircraft veered significantly off course for unknown reasons, possibly to avoid weather. The accident occurred 25 miles from runway 9R at El Alto airport.

On-site investigation
He did retrieve various small parts of the aircraft cockpit, official flight-related paperwork, and some items from the passenger cabin.

Discovery of wreckage
Over the years, the debris moved along with the glacier and eventually emerged enough that climbers were able to uncover wreckage in 2006. No bodies were found, though various personal effects of the passengers were recovered. Local climbers believed it was only a matter of time before bodies,  the flight data recorder and cockpit voice recorder emerge from the ice.

On 4 June 2016, after one of the warmest years on record in the area, human remains and a piece of wreckage labelled "CKPT VO RCDR" were recovered by a team of five in the Andes mountains. Dan Futrell and Isaac Stoner of Operation Thonapa recovered six large orange metal segments and several damaged pieces of magnetic tape.

On 4 January 2017, Futrell and Stoner—who had been inspired to undertake the search by reading of Flight 980 in the Wikipedia article "List of unrecovered flight recorders"—met with NTSB investigator Bill English to officially hand off the recovered components, following the approval in December 2016 of the Bolivian General Directorate of Civil Aviation for the NTSB to proceed with the analysis attempt.

On 7 February 2017, the NTSB released a statement that what had been found was the "cockpit voice recorder rack" and the "flight data recorder pressurized container assembly", both of which are exterior pieces of the flight recorders that surround the data recording mechanisms in either device but do not hold data themselves. The promising spool turned out to be ¾-inch U-Matic videotape that "when reviewed was found to contain an 18-minute recording of the 1966 "Trial by Treehouse" episode of the television series I Spy, dubbed in Spanish".

See also
List of accidents and incidents involving commercial aircraft
List of unrecovered and unusable flight recorders

References

External links
 
New York Times article
ABC News article, "Unearthing the 32-Year Mystery of Crashed Eastern Airlines Flight 980", 15 December 2016

Airliner accidents and incidents involving controlled flight into terrain
Aviation accidents and incidents in Bolivia
Aviation accidents and incidents in 1985
Accidents and incidents involving the Boeing 727
980
1985 in Bolivia
January 1985 events in South America
1985 disasters in Bolivia